Brian John Carlin (born June 13, 1950) is a Canadian former professional ice hockey player who played five games with the Los Angeles Kings during the 1971–72 season, then changed leagues to play nearly a full season with the Albert Oilers for the inaugural 1972–73 season, staying with the renamed Edmonton Oilers for five games in the 1973–74 season, after which he retired from hockey. Carlin was born in Calgary, Alberta and grew up in Gleichen, Alberta.

Career statistics

Regular season and playoffs

External links
 

1950 births
Living people
Calgary Centennials players
Canadian ice hockey left wingers
Edmonton Oilers (WHA) players
Ice hockey people from Calgary
Los Angeles Kings draft picks
Los Angeles Kings players
Medicine Hat Tigers players
People from Wheatland County, Alberta
Springfield Kings players
Winston-Salem Polar Twins (SHL) players